Cnemaspis thackerayi, also known as  Thackeray's dwarf gecko, is a species of gecko endemic to India.

Etymology
The epithet, thackerayi, is in honor of Indian conservationist and wildlife researcher Tejas Thackeray.

References

 http://reptile-database.reptarium.cz/species?genus=Cnemaspis&species=thackerayi

thackerayi
Reptiles of India
Reptiles described in 2019